The 2008 Beni Amrane bombings were two bombings on June 9, 2008 that killed 13 people in the town of Beni Amrane in the Boumerdès Province,  from Algiers, the capital of Algeria. The first bomb killed a French citizen and his Algerian driver as they were leaving the town's railway station. The second device exploded about five minutes later as rescue workers arrived. Eight soldiers and three firefighters died in the second blast while an unconfirmed number of people suffered injuries.  Both devices appeared to have been detonated remotely. No group has claimed the bombings, which follow attacks blamed on the al-Qaeda Organization in the Islamic Maghreb group. The Frenchman was an engineer working for a French firm on a renovation project at the station.

International reactions

Countries
 – The French Foreign Minister Bernard Kouchner condemned the attack. "I want to express my feeling of disgust and my absolute condemnation of this blind terrorist violence that nothing can justify,".

See also
 Terrorist bombings in Algeria
 Insurgency in the Maghreb (2002–present)
List of terrorist incidents, 2008

References

External links
BBC News

Mass murder in 2008
Terrorist incidents in Algeria in 2008
Improvised explosive device bombings in Africa
Terrorist incidents in Algeria
Islamic terrorism in Algeria
2008 murders in Algeria